Åland Post is the company responsible for postal service in Åland. Åland Post has been operating separately from the mainland postal service of Finland since 1993.

Åland Post is a logistics enterprise with 250 employees. The 2017 turnover was 38.2 million euro. Since 1 January 2009, Åland Post is a limited company owned solely by the Åland Landskapsregering, the Government of Åland.

References

Communications in Åland
Companies of Åland
Aland
1993 establishments in Finland